The 2018–19 Electric Production Car Series was to be the inaugural season of the zero-emission motorsport championship. The season would have started at Jerez on 4 November 2018, but was postponed indefinitely due to a lack of a lead investor.

Teams and drivers
 All teams will use the modified Tesla Model S P100D car. All teams will use tyres provided by Pirelli. Teams are yet to be identified.

Calendar
The provisional calendar for the 2018–19 season was announced on 24 April 2018.

References

External links
 

Green racing
Sports car racing series
Zero-emissions vehicles